53 Aurigae is a binary star system in the northern constellation of Auriga. It is visible to the naked eye as a dim star with a combined apparent visual magnitude of 5.74. The system is receding from the Earth with a heliocentric radial velocity of 13 km/s.

The two components of 53 Aurigae orbit each other every 39 years with an eccentricity of 0.557. The primary component, 53 Aurigae A, is chemically peculiar since it contains higher-than-normal amounts of manganese, but also europium, chromium, and mercury. It is a B-type main-sequence star, while the secondary component, 53 Aurigae B, is an early F-type main-sequence star. The total mass of the system is estimated to be .

References

B-type main-sequence stars
Mercury-manganese stars
Binary stars
Auriga (constellation)
Durchmusterung objects
Aurigae, 53
047152
031737
2425
Am stars